Mustafa Latif Topbaş (born 1944) is a Turkish businessman. He is the CEO and cofounder of discount store BİM in 1995.

In 2020, it was revealed that Topbaş was involved in an attempt to obtain a Schengen visa for Saudi businessman Yassin Kadi, at the request of Turkish president Recep Tayyip Erdoğan.

References

1944 births
Turkish billionaires
Living people